The following is a list of notable events and releases of the year 1925 in Norwegian music.

Events

The Norwegian Broadcasting Corporation (NRK) started its transmission in 1925.

Deaths

 July
 5 – Hjalmar Borgstrøm, composer and music critic (born 1864).

 November
 26 – Johannes Haarklou, composer, organist, conductor, and music critic (born 1847).

Births

 January
 1 – Kurt Foss, composer, singer and vaudeville artist (died 1991).

 February
 20 – Hans-Jørgen Holman, musicologist and educationalist (died 1986).

 April
 14 – Ingebrigt Davik, teacher, children's writer, broadcasting personality, singer and songwriter (died 1991).

 May
 4 – Harry W. Kvebæk, classical trumpeter and academic (died 2012).

 June
 19 – Arnstein Johansen, accordionist (died 2013).

See also
 1925 in Norway
 Music of Norway

References

 
Norwegian music
Norwegian
Music
1920s in Norwegian music